is an anime original video animation. The project was created by Satoru Akahori, features the original character designs of Kazushi Hagiwara and Kazuchika Kise. The English name "Combustible Campus Guardress" was originally coined by members of the Project Daicon subtitling group when they did the fansub for No-Name Anime.

The plot involves students from Tobira High School, who are guardians who must prevent the evil "Remnants" from reopening the gate that will let demons take over the world. Predominantly a parody of other "save the world" anime, there are fight scenes throughout the story. It is not suitable for children.

Characters
 Jinno Takumi 
 
 He is the "gate" which will allow evil to spread throughout the world.
 Jinno Hazumi 
 
 A guardian who protects Takumi and treats him as her real younger brother.
 Chiryuu 
 
 Kijima Touta 
 
 McCoy 
 
 Yamashiro Kazuma

Music
 "Innocent Heart" by Kei-Tee
 "Love Diary"

References

External links 
 

1994 anime OVAs
Production I.G
Super Dash Bunko